City of Night is a novel released in 2005 by the best-selling author Dean Koontz and Ed Gorman. The book is the second in Koontz's series, entitled Dean Koontz's Frankenstein. The third book in the series, Dead and Alive, was published in 2009.

Plot
They are stronger, heal better, and think faster than any humans ever created—and they must be destroyed. But not even Victor Helios—once Frankenstein—can stop the engineered killers he’s set loose on a reign of terror through modern-day New Orleans. Now the only hope rests in a one-time “monster” and his all-too-human partners, Detectives Carson O’Connor and Michael Maddison. Deucalion’s centuries-old history began as Victor’s first and failed attempt to build the perfect human–and it is fated to end in the ultimate confrontation between a damned creature and his mad creator. But first Deucalion must destroy a monstrosity not even Victor’s malignant mind could have imagined—an indestructible entity that steps out of humankind’s collective nightmare with one purpose: to replace us.

Releases
Also in 2009, the three novels comprising the trilogy were collectively re-designated as being by Dean Koontz, with the second and future editions effectively airbrushing from history Gorman's contribution to the second installment.

References

External links
Dean Koontz's Frankenstein at his official website

2005 American novels
Novels by Dean Koontz
Collaborative novels
American biopunk novels
Frankenstein novels